Las Marías Airport  is an airport  north of Valdivia, a city in the Los Ríos Region of Chile. The airport operates in daylight hours year-round.

See also

Transport in Chile
List of airports in Chile

References

External links
OurAirports - Las Marías Airport
SkyVector - Las Marías
FallingRain - Las Marías Airport

 Aeródromo Las Marías (SCVL) at Aerodromo.cl

Airports in Chile
Airports in Los Ríos Region